Gridlife is a series of annual music and motorsports festivals held at Gingerman Raceway, Pikes Peak International Raceway, and formerly Road Atlanta. Non-festival events are held at Autobahn Country Club, Mid-Ohio Sports Car Course, Road America, Blackhawk Farms Raceway, & more. GRIDLIFE events feature daytime events such as road racing, Time attack, drifting, car shows and concerts with contemporary EDM, Hip Hop and Alternative music in the evenings.

The festival began with more of a focus on HPDE but has in recent years featured more Time Attack and Drifting as a part of its on track activities. GRIDLIFE regularly features pro Formula Drift drivers.

History 
Gridlife was founded in 2013 with its first event taking place in May 2014 at Gingerman Raceway. The 2014 edition saw an attendance of over 1500 spectators with 220 drivers in HPDE and Time Attack and a field of 30 drift drivers throughout the weekend. Music lineup for 2014 featured headliners WillyJoy, The Hood Internet and surprise set from Autobot of Flosstradamus

Gridlife saw significant growth in 2015 with nearly 4000 attendees and over 300 Drivers on Track for HPDE. The time attack portion of GRIDLIFE was renamed to TrackBattle and featured a large entry field of over 80 cars. Music lineup featured an increased production and headliners RJD2, Keys N Krates, Party Favor, and Pretty Lights Music artist Paul Basic.

References

External links 
 Official Website
 Facebook Page
 http://www.flyingpigsracing.com/ben-marouski/

Media Coverage 
 Super Street 2015 Coverage 
 Speed Academy 2015 Coverage
 Jalopnik 2015 Coverage
 S3 Magazine 2015 Coverage
 Ironwrks 2015 Coverage
 Build Race Party 2015 Coverage
 Build Race Party 2016 Coverage

Racing
Music festivals established in 2014
Drifting (motorsport)
Electronic music festivals in the United States
Auto racing organizations in the United States
Sports car racing